Bulimeulima incolorata is a species of medium-sized sea snail, a marine gastropod mollusk in the family Eulimidae. The species is one of two known species to exist within the genus Bulimeulima; the other congener is Bulimeulima magna.

Distribution
This marine species of gastropod is found in Antarctic waters.

References

External links
 To World Register of Marine Species

Eulimidae
Gastropods described in 1912